HMS Ford was a Hunt-class minesweeper of the Aberdare sub-class built for the Royal Navy during World War I.

Design and description
The Aberdare sub-class were enlarged versions of the original Hunt-class ships with a more powerful armament. The ships displaced  at normal load. The ships' complement consisted of 74 officers and ratings.

The ships had two vertical triple-expansion steam engines, each driving one shaft, using steam provided by two Yarrow boilers.

The Aberdare sub-class was armed with a quick-firing (QF)  gun forward of the bridge and a QF twelve-pounder (76.2 mm) anti-aircraft gun aft. Some ships were fitted with six- or three-pounder guns in lieu of the twelve-pounder.

Construction and career
Ford was built by Dunlop Bremmer in their Port Glasgow shipyard. The ship was renamed from HMS Fleetwood prior to being launched in 1918.

Service as Forde
In 1928 she was sold to Townsend Bros and converted into a car ferry between Dover and Calais, fitted with a stern door which folded down onto the quay. However, this was unusable, and the cars were craned on. She could carry 165 passengers and 26 cars. Two general saloons, a ladies’ saloon and three private state rooms were constructed.

During the Second World War, Forde served under the Admiralty as a salvage vessel. Afterwards she was refitted at Southampton and returned to Dover as a car ferry on 12 April 1947. She was withdrawn in October 1949, sold to Bland Line, renamed "Gibel Tarik" and finished her days as a car ferry between Gibraltar and Tangier, Morocco, finally being withdrawn in 1954.

Notes

References
 
 
 

 

Hunt-class minesweepers (1916)
Royal Navy ship names
Ships built on the River Clyde
1918 ships
Ships of Bland Line